Rajeshwar Prasad Narain Sinha (born 29 December 1906, date of death unknown) was an Indian politician. He was a Member of Parliament, representing Bihar in the Rajya Sabha the upper house of India's Parliament as a member of the Indian National Congress.

References

Rajya Sabha members from Bihar
Indian National Congress politicians
1906 births
Year of death missing
Indian National Congress politicians from Bihar